The 2019 Mountain West Conference women's basketball tournament was held March 10–13, 2019 at the Thomas & Mack Center on the campus of University of Nevada, Las Vegas, in Las Vegas, Nevada. Boise State won the tournament and received an automatic bid to the 2019 NCAA tournament.

Seeds
Teams are seeded by conference record, with a ties broken by record between the tied teams followed by record against the regular-season champion, if necessary.

Schedule

Bracket

* denotes overtime period

See also
 2019 Mountain West Conference men's basketball tournament

References

Mountain West Conference women's basketball tournament
2018–19 Mountain West Conference women's basketball season
Mountain West Conference Women's Basketball
College sports tournaments in Nevada